Sardar Iftikhar Ahmed Khan is a Pakistani politician who had been a member of the Provincial Assembly of the Punjab from October 2018 till January 2023

Political career
Khan was elected to the Provincial Assembly of Punjab as a candidate of Pakistan Muslim League (N) (PML (N)) from the constituency PP-3 in 2018 Pakistani by-elections held on 14 October 2018. He defeated Muhammad Akbar Khan of Pakistan Tehreek-e-Insaf (PTI). Khan garnered 43,259 votes while his closest rival secured 43,032 votes.

References

Living people
Pakistan Muslim League (N) politicians
Politicians from Punjab, Pakistan
Year of birth missing (living people)